Vice-Admiral Sir Richard Stayner (1625–1662) was an English naval officer who supported the Parliamentary cause during the English Civil War and the Interregnum. During the Anglo-Spanish War (1654–1660), he won renown and a fortune in prize money when he captured a great part of the Spanish West Indian treasure fleet off Cadiz in 1656. He was knighted by the Lord Protector Oliver Cromwell for services in Admiral Robert Blake's destruction of Spanish ships at Santa Cruz, 1657. He was a rear-admiral of the fleet which brought Charles II to England in 1660. He was again knighted at the Restoration. He died at Lisbon, while serving as vice-admiral of the Mediterranean fleet.

Biography
Richard Stayner was one of several children of Roger Stayner of Tarrant Gunville, Dorset.

In his youth served in the Newfoundland fisheries trade. He joined the Parliamentary navy and served in a subordinate rank during the Civil War. On 22 June 1649 he was appointed commander of the  prize, "now a State's ship", though a very small one, her principal armament being two sakers (that is, six-pounders). She was specially fitted out "for surprising small pickaroons that lurk among the sands" on the Essex coast, and for convoy service in the North Sea.

He was certainly with the fleet in the following April, when he signed the declaration of the sea-officers on the dissolution of the Rump Parliament by Oliver Cromwell, which was, in fact, a resolution "not to meddle with state affairs, but to keep foreigners from fooling us".

In the battle off the Gabbard on 2–3 June 1653, Stayner commanded the Foresight in the white squadron under the immediate command of William Penn, and was afterwards sent into the river in convoy of twelve disabled ships, eleven Dutch prizes, with 1,350 prisoners, and the body of Admiral Richard Deane, which he was ordered to take to Woolwich.

Stayner rejoined the fleet in time to take part in the decisive battle of Scheveningen (29–31 July), and continued with it until the end of the season.

In July he was appointed by Blake to the Catherine, and in September sailed for the Mediterranean with Blake, returning to England with him in October 1655. In the following February he was in command of the Bridgwater and sailed again with Blake for Cadiz, which was kept closely blockaded.

Nothing could be done that night, and the next morning several of Stayner's ships had fallen to leeward. He had only three with him, but these were the powerful ships just named; and as they were now within twelve miles of Cadiz, he judged that delay was unwise, and attacked the Spaniards about nine o'clock in morning. Of the four capital ships in the Spanish fleet, one escaped and ran for Cadiz, but struck on a rock and went to the bottom. The three others were captured, but two of them caught fire and were burnt with all their cargo and a great part of their men. The fourth remained in the possession of the English; some of the other ships also were taken. The value of the prize to the captors was estimated at £600,000; but it was stated by the Spaniards that their loss was not less than nine million dollars, or nearly two millions sterling. The news of this tremendous blow reached England early in October. An official narrative of it was published on 4 October, and a thanksgiving service ordered to be held on the 8th in all the churches in London and Westminster.

Shortly after this Stayner returned to England with Edward Montagu  (later Earl of Sandwich); but rejoined Blake early the next year, and took a brilliant part in the destruction of the Spanish ships at Santa Cruz on 20 April.

Having arranged the ships with the utmost care and judgement, and those ships being supported by a considerable number of forts and batteries on shore, the Spaniards thought themselves so perfectly secure, in case of an attack, that their admiral sent Blake an open defiance. On reconnoitring the force and position of the enemy, the English admiral found it impossible to bring off the enemy's ships, though gallantry and prudence might render it possible to destroy them.  Stayner was immediately detached to begin the attack, and being supported by Blake with the remainder of the fleet, the Spaniards were, in a very few hours, driven out of their ships and breast-works The former were instantly taken possession of by the English: and it being impossible to bring them off they were all set on fire and burnt to the water's edge.

The Royalist politician and historian Edward Hyde, Earl of Clarendon eulogised this action, writing:

For his conduct on this occasion he was knighted by the Lord Protector Cromwell on his return to England in the following August. His work was entirely administrative, and he had no active share in the battles of Mardyke and Dunkirk, though he was in constant communication with Sir William Goodsonn, by whom they were entirely conducted. In the summer of 1659 he was rear-admiral of the fleet with Montagu in the Sound, and on 16 April 1660 was appointed by Montagu to be rear-admiral of the fleet which went over to bring King Charles II to England. For this service he was knighted on 24 September (his earlier knighthood, conferred by Cromwell, not being recognised by the Royalists).

In the early summer of 1661 Stayner was again commander-in-chief in the Downs, and in June sailed for Lisbon and the Mediterranean as rear-admiral of the fleet under Montagu now the Earl of Sandwich. When Sandwich took de facto possession of Tangier, it was Stayner who was put in command of the first shore battalion of seamen. Then, when Sandwich went to Lisbon to take Catherine of Braganza to London, Stayner, with his flag in the Mary, remained as vice-admiral of the fleet under Sir John Lawson. On 2 July it was reported from Lisbon that he had just arrived from Tangiers; on 20 July that he was dangerously ill; on 9 October that he had died—apparently a few days before. In pursuance of his wish to be buried beside his wife, who seems to have died in 1658, his body was embalmed and brought home in the Mary, which arrived at Spithead on 3 November.

Family
Richard Stayner married Elizabeth (1635?–1662), daughter of Thomas Hebbe of Loughborough. They had two children, Richard and Elizabeth.

On 30 May 1663 Richard petitioned for repayment of £300 which his father had advanced for the king's service. The claim was approved by Sandwich, but there is no mention of the money having been paid.

Notes

References

Attribution

1625 births
1662 deaths
Roundheads
People in English Tangier